This list contains all twelve official flags of provinces of the Netherlands, including the pennons.

Historical flags

See also 
 Coats of arms of provinces of the Netherlands
 List of Dutch flags

Provinces
.Flags
Netherlands
Flags
Netherlands